Dad is a BBC1 sitcom that ran for 13 episodes (each 30 minutes long) over two series and a Christmas special. Described by the BBC as a 'generation-gap comedy', it centered on the trials and tribulations of Alan Hook (Kevin McNally) and his father Brian (George Cole). Alan would often find himself getting increasingly frustrated with the endeavours of his father, whilst the world seemed to be forever against him.

Toby Ross-Bryant played Alan's son Vincent, and Julia Hills played Alan's wife Beryl. It was written by Andrew Marshall, who was best known for his popular sitcom 2point4 Children. The title of each episode was a pun on the word 'Dad'.

The theme tune for the first series was the 1965 hit 'Tijuana Taxi' performed by Herb Alpert & the Tijuana Brass. For the second series this was replaced with the song 'Go Daddy-O' by Californian swing revival band Big Bad Voodoo Daddy.

Cast
 Kevin McNally as Alan Hook
 George Cole as Brian Hook
 Toby Ross-Bryant as Vincent Hook
 Julia Hills as Beryl Hook

Initially, due to Julia Hills being in 2point4 Children, which was still running come the transmission of 'Dad', the BBC didn't want her to be in it. However, after her audition, any fears and doubts were quickly quashed.

Plot
Alan Hook is a highly-strung and often unfortunate individual, constantly getting frustrated with the endeavours of his father Brian, and forever venting his anger at the world around him. His long-suffering wife Beryl tries her best to keep her husband calm, though this proves difficult due to Brian, who, without meaning to, is always getting on his son's nerves with his over engineered ideas, and old fashioned ways.

Then there is Alan's own son Vincent, a typical moody teenager who Alan seems to be forever embarrassing.

Episodes

Series 1 (1997)
The theme tune for the first series was the 1965 hit "Tijuana Taxi" performed by Herb Alpert & the Tijuana Brass. The first episode was shot as part of a handful of pilots for various shows, and was then one of the few chosen to be made into a full series. Alan's house in series one differs to that in series two; the director wanted a bigger set for the kitchen, to fit more cameras in, hence the house move.

Series 2 (1999)
For the second series the theme song was 'Go Daddy-O' by Californian swing revival band Big Bad Voodoo Daddy.
Series Two also comprised six episodes and was first aired from 11 January to 15 February 1999, but this time on Mondays at 8.30 pm. The episodes were entitled (in order of their airing):

Christmas Special (1999)
The final episode was a Christmas special that aired on 21 December 1999, this time a Tuesday, at 8.30 pm. It broke with the tradition of punning on 'Dad' for the title, and was named 'Nemesis', although Andrew Marshall later revealed that the original title "Feliz Navidad" was nixed by the BBC, feeling it too obscure.

Reception
The show received less critical acclaim than the similar BBC family sitcom 2point4 Children, also written by Andrew Marshall.

Cancellation
During the second series, writer Andrew Marshall was convinced the show would go to a third series. Kevin McNally also believed they'd be doing the show for quite a while. However, after 13 episodes, and despite going from strength to strength, 'Dad' ended with a 1999 Christmas special. McNally commented that the show got 'somehow lost', and its cancellation was to do with a regime change at the BBC. George Cole believed the shows cancellation was down to focus groups that began to decide what TV shows should be axed.

Home release
Both series one and two are available on DVD in Australia; they were released by 'Madman'. Both DVDs come with special features, one of which is an audio commentary from George Cole and Kevin McNally who discuss the show; it hasn't been released in the United States or UK, and it also isn't repeated on TV in these two countries.

Trivia
The estate agent named on the 'for sale' signs in the first episode of series 2 are called 'Renwick'; a nod to Andrew Marshall's ex-writing partner, David Renwick.

References

External links
Dad at the BBC Comedy Guide

Dad at Phill.co.uk

BBC television sitcoms
1990s British sitcoms
1997 British television series debuts
1999 British television series endings